is a 1991 competitive sports video game developed and published for the Sega Genesis by Namco. It was re-released for the Wii's Virtual Console in Japan on February 19, 2008, and in North America on March 24, 2008, at a cost of 800 Wii Points. This version is virtually identical to the original version. An enhanced remake of it was remade for Namco Anthology 1 for the PlayStation exclusive to Japan.

Gameplay

The game contains elements of American football, Association football, and Rugby. Two teams square off against each other with the goal of either kicking a powerball against a backstop or running the ball into the endzone. Kicked goals are worth one point and touchdowns are worth three.

The game begins with a scramble, as the ball is dropped at the center between five players from each side. Players advance the ball toward their opponent's goal by running with it, throwing it, or kicking it. Players on offense or defense are allowed to execute any number of wrestling-type moves in order to obstruct or even knock out opponents. The goal is defended by a goal keeper who is generally faster, stronger and more durable than other player types.

Players can initially choose between eight teams representing Japan, Korea, Brazil, Greece, the USSR, the United States, the United Kingdom and China.
After beating them in the league, we also play against teams from Mexico, Germany, Canada and in the final of France.

Team names:
 Brazil – Amazons
 Canada – Mounties
 China – Emperors
 France – Legionnaires
 Germany – Knights
 Greece – Spartans
 Japan – Samurais
 Korea – Warriors
 Mexico – Aztecs
 United Kingdom – Pirates
 USA – Rough Riders
 USSR – Cossacks

Reception

Notes

References

1991 video games
Fantasy sports video games
Namco games
Sega Genesis games
Video games developed in Japan
Virtual Console games
Multiplayer and single-player video games